Jafarabad-e Sofla (also Romanized as Ja‘farābād-e Soflá; also known as Ja‘farābād-e Pā’īn, Ja‘farābād-e Fārūj, and Ja‘farābād) is a village in Titkanlu Rural District, Khabushan District, Faruj County, North Khorasan Province, Iran. At the 2006 census, its population was 863, in 223 families.

References 

Populated places in Faruj County